LLCInvest (LLC Invest) is a large conglomerate of companies with assets worth tens of billions of dollars. Almost all organizations included in LLCInvest do not have public activities. The company became widely known on June 20, 2022, after the publication of a journalistic investigation by Meduza and OCCRP. Most of the organizations are tied to Rossiya Bank, often described as Vladimr Putin’s personal cashbox.

The llcinvest.ru domain is owned by Moskomsvyaz, that is closely linked to Bank Rossiya.

Closely affiliated assets
In total, there are more than 85 companies and organizations, that use mail from the llcinvest.ru domain (use as its official email or by directors or shareholders). They own monetary assets in the amount at least 4.5 billion dollars.  Among them:

Companies
 Joint Stock Company "Altituda" (owns 51 % share in RusGazDobycha)
 Russair

Real estate
 Putin's Palace
 Vineyards and Winery Lazurnaya Yagoda near Putin's Palace
 Igora Ski Resort
 Igora Drive motorsport complex
 Mansion near Igora
 Fisherman's Hut and 420 hectares of land near Lake Ladoga 
 Villa Sellgren
 Villa in Rus Sanatorium in Sochi
 Land and buildings near Dolgiye Borody residence
 House of Katerina Tikhonova

Vessels
 Shellest ($23,145,000)
 Nega (~ $10,000,000)
 Aldoga (~ $9,000,000)
 Brizo 46 (~ $1,200,000)

Aircraft

 New model Falcon 7X (tail number RA-09009)

Other affiliated assets 
Companies Delta and Ena-Invest did not use llcinvest domains, but do have visible connections to LLCInvest companies. Delta owns 17 % share in Sibur, Ena-Invest owns 19 % share in Novatek. These assets have value almost 12 billion dollars.

See also
 Ozero (LLCInvest is often referred to as "digital consumer cooperative Ozero").

References 

Companies of Russia